Robin 'Bob' Greenwood (born 24 March 1947) is a former Australian rules footballer who played with Essendon in the Victorian Football League (VFL) during the late 1960s and early 1970s.

Greenwood, a rover, came to Essendon from Pascoe Vale and made his league debut in 1967. Despite playing 12 games in the 1968 home and away season, Greenwood lost his place in the side for the finals series and subsequently missed out on Essendon's Grand Final appearance. He averaged over a goal a game for Essendon and kicked 23 goals in 1970.

Greenwood left the VFL in 1972 and was signed by Claremont, where he played until 1975. While in Western Australia he represented the state at the 1972 Perth Carnival. He finished his career in 1976, as captain-coach of Queensland club Kedron.

References

Holmesby, Russell and Main, Jim (2007). The Encyclopedia of AFL Footballers. 7th ed. Melbourne: Bas Publishing.

1947 births
Australian rules footballers from Victoria (Australia)
Essendon Football Club players
Claremont Football Club players
Kedron Football Club players
Pascoe Vale Football Club players
Living people